Walnut Township may refer to:

Arkansas
 Walnut Township, Benton County, Arkansas, in Benton County, Arkansas
 Walnut Township, Montgomery County, Arkansas, in Montgomery County, Arkansas

Illinois
 Walnut Township, Bureau County, Illinois

Indiana
 Walnut Township, Marshall County, Indiana
 Walnut Township, Montgomery County, Indiana

Iowa
 Walnut Township, Adair County, Iowa
 Walnut Township, Appanoose County, Iowa
 Walnut Township, Dallas County, Iowa
 Walnut Township, Fremont County, Iowa
 Walnut Township, Jefferson County, Iowa
 Walnut Township, Madison County, Iowa
 Walnut Township, Palo Alto County, Iowa
 Walnut Township, Polk County, Iowa
 Walnut Township, Wayne County, Iowa

Kansas
 Walnut Township, Atchison County, Kansas
 Walnut Township, Barton County, Kansas
 Walnut Township, Bourbon County, Kansas
 Walnut Township, Brown County, Kansas
 Walnut Township, Butler County, Kansas
 Walnut Township, Cowley County, Kansas
 Walnut Township, Crawford County, Kansas
 Walnut Township, Jewell County, Kansas
 Walnut Township, Marshall County, Kansas, in Marshall County, Kansas
 Walnut Township, Pawnee County, Kansas, in Pawnee County, Kansas
 Walnut Township, Phillips County, Kansas, in Phillips County, Kansas
 Walnut Township, Reno County, Kansas, in Reno County, Kansas
 Walnut Township, Saline County, Kansas, in Saline County, Kansas

Missouri
 Walnut Township, Adair County, Missouri
 Walnut Township, Bates County, Missouri

Ohio
 Walnut Township, Fairfield County, Ohio
 Walnut Township, Gallia County, Ohio
 Walnut Township, Pickaway County, Ohio

Oklahoma
 Walnut Township, Caddo County, Oklahoma, in Caddo County, Oklahoma
 Walnut Township, Noble County, Oklahoma, in Noble County, Oklahoma

See also
 Walnut (disambiguation)

Township name disambiguation pages